John George Jones (September 18, 1849 – June 7, 1914) was an American lawyer, Freemason, and state legislator in Chicago, Illinois who advocated for civil rights.

Born in Ithaca, New York on November 9, 1849. His family relocated to Chicago when he was 7. Jones studied law and was admitted to the Illinois bar on March 24, 1881. Known as "Indignation" Jones, due to his assertiveness as he fought for civil rights in the state of Illinois, he practiced criminal law in his Chicago, Illinois office located at 191 Clark Street. Later, he was elected State Representative of the 5th District of Cook County Illinois. He was a very active Prince Hall Freemason until his expulsion from the Most Worshipful Prince Hall Grand Lodge of Illinois in 1904. Jones died on June 7, 1914, and was interred at the Oakwood Cemetery in Chicago. In 2002, the irregular General Grand Masonic Congress dedicated a memorial wall to him at that cemetery.

He worked to combat discrimination against fellow African Americans. He served in the Illinois House of Representatives from 1901 to 1903.

See also
List of African-American officeholders (1900–1959)

References

1849 births
1914 deaths
19th-century American lawyers
African-American lawyers
American Prince Hall Freemasons
Lawyers from Chicago
People from Ithaca, New York
20th-century African-American people